The Serra do Mar (Portuguese for Sea's Ridge or Sea Ridge) is a 1,500 km long system of mountain ranges and escarpments in Southeastern Brazil.

Geography
The Serra do Mar runs parallel to the Atlantic Ocean coast from the state of Espírito Santo to southern Santa Catarina, although some literature includes the Serra Geral in the Serra do Mar, in which case the range would extend to northeastern Rio Grande do Sul.

This escarpment is part of the Great Escarpment that runs along much of the eastern coast of Brazil south from the city of Salvador, Bahia.

Mountain ranges
The mountain ranges are discontinuous in several places and are given individual names such as Serra de Bocaina, Serra de Paranapiacaba, Serra Negra, Serra dos Órgãos, Serra do Indaiá, etc. The range also extends to some large islands near the coastline, such as Ilhabela and Ilha Anchieta.

Geologically, the range belongs to the massive crystalline rock platform that forms Eastern South America, and tectonically it is very stable. Most of the elevations of Serra do Mar were formed about 60 million years ago.

Natural history

At the time of the European discovery of Brazil (1500), the Serra do Mar supported a rich and highly diversified ecosystem, composed mainly of lush tropical rain forest, called Atlantic Forest (Mata Atlântica). Due to urbanization and deforestation, however, most of the forest cover has been destroyed and what cover remains is almost exclusively on the steep escarpments facing the sea.

A chain of national and state parks, ecological stations and biological reserves now protect the Mata Atlântica and its biological heritage, but acid rain, pollution, poachers, clandestine loggers, forest fires and encroachment by urban areas and farms are still causing active destruction, particularly in the areas around cities. Several large metropolises, such as Vale do Itajaí, Curitiba, São Paulo and Rio de Janeiro, are near the Serra do Mar.

Reforestation and recuperation of biological diversity are notoriously difficult to bring about in destroyed rain forest habitats.

See also
 
Ecoregions of the Atlantic Forest biome
List of plants of Atlantic Forest vegetation of Brazil

References

Mar, Serra do
Atlantic Forest
Escarpments
Landforms of Espírito Santo
Landforms of Rio de Janeiro (state)
Landforms of São Paulo (state)
Landforms of Santa Catarina (state)
World Heritage Sites in Brazil